Peter H. Booth served in the Arkansas House of Representatives in 1893 from January 9 to April 8.
He and other legislators from the 1893 session were pictured in a composite of their photographs.

He was described years after his service as having introduced a single bill that was tabled by white legislators.

By 1917 he was working as a bootblack for the House of Representatives rather than serving it as a member, and at the time there no be no other black member of the house after the 1893 session. One paper claimed "Water had sought its level" regarding Booth's change in status at the House.

See also
African-American officeholders during and following the Reconstruction era

References

19th-century American politicians
Members of the Arkansas House of Representatives